John Stevens House is a historic home located at Mount Vernon, Westchester County, New York. It was built between 1849 and 1851 and is a five-by-three-bay, -story, substantial frame farmhouse.  It features a 1-story porch across the front elevation that incorporates six Doric order columns and a dentiled cornice.  It was the home of John Stevens (1803–1882), founder of Mount Vernon.

It was added to the National Register of Historic Places in 1972.

See also
National Register of Historic Places listings in southern Westchester County, New York

References

Houses on the National Register of Historic Places in New York (state)
Houses completed in 1851
Mount Vernon, New York
Houses in Westchester County, New York
1851 establishments in New York (state)
National Register of Historic Places in Westchester County, New York